Evans v. Michigan, 568 U.S. 313 (2013), was a United States Supreme Court case in which the Court held that if a person accused of a crime receives a directed acquittal, the Double Jeopardy Clause bars a second trial of that person for the same crime, even if the person was acquitted in error.

References

External links
 

United States Supreme Court cases
United States Supreme Court cases of the Roberts Court
2013 in United States case law
Legal history of Michigan
United States Double Jeopardy Clause case law